Nikos Kenourgios (born 8 September 1998) is a Greek professional footballer who plays as a left-back for Super League 2 club Athens Kallithea.

Career
Kenourgios started his career with Alimos, followed by PAS Giannina U20. In the summer of 2017 he started his professional career by signing with Aittitos Spata to be followed a year later by Sparta before leaving for Belgium.  In 2019, Kenourgios signed for Zulte Waregem. In his first season he did not get many opportunities but in the second he counted 15 appearances and 2 goals, however those performances did not prove capable of keeping him in Waregem. As a result, he mutually solved his contract with the club. During the summer, had several proposals, among them with Greek giants Olympiakos, but without reaching any agreement. 

On 27 October 2021, Nikos Kenourgios found the next stage of his career. The 23-year-old left back signed at Dinamo București a year contract with an additional option for another year. He left Dinamo after only five months.

References

External links

1998 births
Footballers from Athens
Greek footballers
Living people
Association football midfielders
PAS Giannina F.C. players
Aittitos Spata F.C. players
A.E. Sparta P.A.E. players
S.V. Zulte Waregem players
FC Dinamo București players
Football League (Greece) players
Belgian Pro League players
Liga I players
Greek expatriate footballers
Expatriate footballers in Belgium
Greek expatriate sportspeople in Belgium
Expatriate footballers in Romania
Greek expatriate sportspeople in Romania